Benish Hayat also spelt as Binish Hayat is a former international field hockey player and current international umpire from Pakistan. To date, she is Pakistan's only international women umpire.

Since 2017, she has the status of a "Promising Umpire" which entitles her to officiate in matches throughout the world.

Career (player) 
Hayat took up playing hockey during her college days at Government College for Women, Wahdat Road, Lahore in 2002.

National 
During her entire playing career (2004-2011), Hayat represented WAPDA.

International 
Hayat was part of the national side between 2004 and 2011 earning 10 caps. Her only overseas tournament was the 2006 Asian Games qualifiers held in Kuala Lumpur, Malaysia in June where the team placed 4th. The team qualified for the 2006 Asian Games held in Doha, Qatar but later withdrew.

Career (Umpiring) 
Her mentor is the Pakistani international umpire, Haider Rasool.

National 
Hayat officiated in the men's National Tray Hockey Championships held in Lahore in October–November 2020.

International 
Hayat umpired her first match in December 2012 at the Women Asia Cup held in Singapore and to date has officiated in 49 matches. In 2013, as a result of her performance at the Asian Challenge in Bangkok, Thailand she was officially given the status of an "International Umpire" by the FIH. She continued with this status until 2017, when she was promoted and given the status of a "Promising Umpire." This status entitles her to officiate in matches throughout the world including in FIH events. She has officiated matches at the senior and junior (under 21) levels. She has attended courses including the Olympic Solidarity Technical Course for Coaches and FIH Qualified Hockey Academy Educator.

At the 2018 Asian Games, she officiated in women's matches of Pool A as well as the 9/10 classification match. She was the on field umpire in 4 matches, reserve umpire in 2 and video umpire in 1.

Hockey Academy 
In 2016, Hayat established the Canex Hockey Academy in Lahore to train girls between the ages of 8 and 13.

References 

Living people
Pakistani women field hockey players
Year of birth missing (living people)
Women referees and umpires
21st-century Pakistani women